SAPA (original name Savannan Pallo) was founded in Helsinki in 1970. The club was established at the Savanna restaurant when a group of young men wanted more activities than sitting around the place. It was eventually decided that a sports club's name could not be the restaurant's name and as a result the name was changed to the abbreviation SAPA.  In addition to football the club provides for the sport of floorball.

SAPA run two men's teams, their home ground being located at the Kumpulanlaakson kenttä. (Kumpulanlaakso playing-field). The women's football team played one season in the 1970s in the Finnish first division.  Junior football started in June 1986 and the club currently provides for a wide range of age groups. In total the club has over 50 adult players and more than 250 junior players.

Most recently in the 2020/21 season, the highest ranking men’s team, SAPA M3, finished 4th in Kolmonen. SAPA M3 boasts an impressive squad with international players, and a loyal fan following group called the SAPA ULTRAS.

Season to season

2012 season

For the current season SAPA are competing in Section 2 (Lohko 2) of the Kolmonen administered by the Helsinki SPL and Uusimaa SPL.  This is the fourth highest tier in the Finnish football system.

SAPA/2 are participating in Section 2 (Lohko 2) of the Nelonen administered by the Helsinki SPL.

References and sources
Official Website
Finnish Wikipedia
Suomen Cup
 SAPA – Savannan Pallo Facebook

Footnotes

Football clubs in Helsinki
Association football clubs established in 1970
1970 establishments in Finland